The 2008–09 Scottish Junior Cup was a competition in Scottish Junior football. It was won by Auchinleck Talbot after they defeated Clydebank 2–1 in the final which had an attendance of 8,122.

Under a 2007 rule change, the Junior Cup winners (along with winners of the North, East and West regional leagues) qualify for the senior Scottish Cup; Auchinleck Talbot therefore competed in the 2009–10 Scottish Cup.

First round
These ties were scheduled to take place on Saturday, TBC.

Second round
These ties were scheduled to take place on Saturday, TBC.

Third round
These ties were scheduled to take place on Saturday, TBC

Fourth round
These ties were scheduled to take place on Saturday, TBC.

Fifth round
These ties were scheduled to take place on Saturday, TBC.

Quarter finals

These ties were played on Saturday, TBC.

Semi-finals
These ties were played on Saturday, TBC.

Final
The final took place on Sunday, TBC.

Scottish Junior Cup seasons
Junior Cup